José Ricardo Rambo ( Ricardo, born August 17, 1971 in Rio Grande do Sul, Brazil), is a Brazilian football coach. He works for football development in Hong Kong after retired from professional football. He is the former player and manager of Rangers (HKG). He was also the head coach of Sun Hei and China League One club Guangdong Sunray Cave previously. He is currently the head coach of Hong Kong women's national football team.

Honours

Manager
Happy Valley
 Hong Kong First Division: 2005–06

Pegasus
 Hong Kong Senior Shield: 2008–09
 Hong Kong FA Cup: 2009–10

Sun Hei
 Hong Kong Senior Shield: 2011–12

Assistant manager
South China
 Hong Kong First Division: 2007–08
 Hong Kong League Cup: 2007–08

External links
José Ricardo Rambo at HKFA

 

1971 births
Living people
Sportspeople from Rio Grande do Sul
Brazilian footballers
Brazilian football managers
Association football defenders
South China AA players
Sun Hei SC players
Happy Valley AA players
TSW Pegasus FC managers
Hong Kong First Division League players
Expatriate footballers in Hong Kong
Brazilian expatriate sportspeople in Hong Kong
Expatriate football managers in China
Hong Kong League XI representative players
Women's national association football team managers